Peter Eardley Sarstedt (10 December 1941 – 8 January 2017) was a British singer-songwriter and instrumentalist. He was the brother of singers Eden Kane, a teenage pop idol and  Clive Sarstedt, with both of whom he also recorded and performed as The Sarstedt Brothers.

Although his music was classified as pop, it generally encompassed ballads derived from traditional folk music rather than traditional rock and roll. He was best known for writing and performing the song "Where Do You Go To (My Lovely)?", which topped the UK Singles Chart in 1969. Set to a "faux European waltz tune" and described as "a romantic novel in song", it won an Ivor Novello Award. The record remained Sarstedt's biggest hit. He had one more hit single and one hit album but despite numerous releases never had chart success again.  

He released the album England's Lane in 1997, which continued the story of the fictional Marie-Clair, titled Last  of the Breed, a planned third installment titled Farewell Marie-Claire did not materialise. 

Sarstedt continued to tour mainly in 1960s revival-type shows, until his retirement in 2010 due to ill health.

Early life
Sarstedt was born in New Delhi in 1941 into a family long resident in India. His ancestor Christian Ludwig Wilhelm Sarstedt, born in 1841 in Hanover, migrated to India and died there in 1893. His father, Albert James Sarstedt, a civil servant in British India, married secondly Coral Byrne. Both of his parents had trained as classical musicians.

After Indian independence from Britain in 1947, Sarstedt's parents managed a tea plantation in the Darjeeling district of West Bengal, where Sarstedt attended Victoria Boys' School, a boarding school in Kurseong. He later moved to Calcutta; in 1954, Sarstedt's father died and the family moved to Britain, settling in south London just before the rock 'n' roll boom. The Sarstedt brothers started out performing skiffle in a group  known as the Fabulous Five.

Sarstedt was a younger brother of the 1960s pop star Eden Kane, for whom he was a backing singer and briefly played bass, and an elder brother of pop singer Clive Sarstedt.

Career

Hit recordings
Sarstedt was best known for his 1969 UK number one single, released on the United Artists label, "Where Do You Go To (My Lovely)?", a portrait of a poor-born girl, Marie-Claire, who becomes a member of the European jet set. The song topped the chart in 14 countries. It was also awarded the 1970 Ivor Novello Award for Best Song Musically and Lyrically. He later cited his first wife, Anita, as the inspiration for the song.

His debut album in 1969 reached number eight on the British charts and his follow-up single, "Frozen Orange Juice", reached number 10 in the UK in 1969. However, subsequent releases failed to chart. Sarstedt's recorded songs include "Beirut", "Take Off Your Clothes" and "I Am a Cathedral".

Another selection from the album Where Do You Go To (My Lovely)?, from which his single of the same title had been released, was an instrumental called "Overture". Sarstedt composed it in collaboration with Ian Green and Ray Singer and it was later used as the theme music for Keep America Beautiful's famous "Crying Indian" public service announcement, which starred Iron Eyes Cody.

Touring
In the 1980s and 1990s, Sarstedt frequently toured the southern UK as part of the "Solid Silver '60s" package tours, having returned to England after several years residing in Denmark. In the 1990s and 2000s, he continued to release new albums and tour. In 1997 he released the album England's Lane, which featured the follow-up to "Where Do You Go To", entitled  "The Last of the Breed" and in 2007 an album of new material called On Song. He sang harmonies on "Don't Think Twice" and "The Last Thing on My Mind" on Canadian singer Peter Thompson's 2007 album, Taking a Dive (Heart First).

Popular culture
New interest was sparked in his music after "Where Do You Go To" was used in the 2007 Wes Anderson films Hotel Chevalier and The Darjeeling Limited. In 2012 a compilation of songs called Highlights—the Demos was released.

Later recordings and touring
Sarstedt's final album, released in 2013, was titled Restless Heart. It was produced by Ray Singer and the single and accompanying video, "Valentine", directed and produced by Lara Singer, was released on Singer Records. A third instalment of "Where Do You Go To", continuing the story of Marie-Claire, to be titled "Farewell Marie-Claire", did not materialize. Sarstedt last performed live in 2010.

Personal life and death
Sarstedt married dentist Anita Atke in 1969 and moved to Denmark. The couple divorced five years later. His second wife was Joanna Meill. From 2013 he lived in a retirement home in Sussex, England. He had progressive supranuclear palsy (PSP), diagnosed in 2015, but originally misdiagnosed as dementia in 2013. He died on 8 January 2017 at the age of 75. He is survived by his wife and two adult children.

Siblings
Sarstedt's brothers are
"Rick" Sarstedt (born Richard Graham Sarstedt, 29 March 1940, in New Delhi, India) who himself topped the UK Singles Chart in 1961 with "Well I Ask You," under the stage name Eden Kane.
Robin Sarstedt (born Clive Robin Sarstedt, 21 January 1944, in Ajmer, Rajasthan, India), the youngest brother, who made his recording debut as "Wes Sands" (recorded by Joe Meek), and then continued as "Clive Sands". He had a hit in 1976 (as "Robin Sarstedt") with the Hoagy Carmichael cover "My Resistance Is Low."

Discography

Singles

Albums
Sarstedt issued 15 albums in his 50-year-long career.

See also
List of artists who reached number one on the UK Singles Chart
List of number-one singles in Australia during the 1960s
List of performers on Top of the Pops
United Artists Records

Notes

References

External links
  from The Lost Album (2008), published by Singer Records

1941 births
2017 deaths
British male singers
British songwriters
Indian emigrants to the United Kingdom
Ivor Novello Award winners
People from New Delhi
United Artists Records artists
Island Records artists
Singers from London
People from Croydon
People from Darjeeling district
Singers from Kolkata
Neurological disease deaths in England
Deaths from progressive supranuclear palsy